Parabembras is a genus of marine ray-finned fish belonging to the family Bembridae, the deepwater flatheads, although they are sufficiently different from the other genera in that family to be classified as their own family, Parabembradidae, by some authorities. These fishes are found in the Indian Ocean and the western Pacific Ocean.

Taxonomy
Parabembras was first described as a genus in 1874 by the Dutch physician, herpetologist and ichthyologist Pieter Bleeker as a monotypic genus with its only species being Bembras curtus. which had been described in 1843 by Temminck and Schlegel from Nagasaki. The 5th edition of Fishes of the World places Parabembras in the family Bembridae with the other deepwater flatheads but other authorities classify it within its own monotypic family, the Parabembradidae. Parabembradidae was first proposed as a family in 1925, with the name then being Parabembridae, by the American ichthyologists David Starr Jordan and Carl Leavitt Hubbs.

Species
The currently recognized species in this genus are: with a new species described in 2018.
 Parabembras curta (Temminck & Schlegel, 1843) - northwestern Pacific 
 Parabembras multisquamata Kai, Fricke, 2018 - southwestern Pacific and the Philippines
 Parabembras robinsoni Regan, 1921 (African deep-water flathead) - southwestern Indian Ocean

Etymology
Parabembras combines para, meaning "near", with Bembras, the type genus of the Bembridae and the original genus of P. curta.

Characteristics
Parabembras differs from the other Bembrid genera by having 3 spines in the anal fin whereas the others have none. The lower jaw protrudes past the lower and the maxilla is narrow to its rear.

Distribution and habitat
Parabembras deepwater flatheads are found in the southwestern Indian Ocean and the Western Pacific Ocean.

References

Bembridae
 
Monotypic fish genera
Taxa named by Pieter Bleeker